Culture Club is a box set of music by English band Culture Club, comprising four CDs. It was released in 2002 on the Virgin label. Some of the songs included are also Boy George solo songs.

The box set represents a history of the band with an array of singles, album tracks, demos, remixes, alternative versions, and previously unreleased songs. The inner artwork includes a 72-page glossy booklet, official photos, quotes, and notes from band members. All previously unreleased tracks have been remastered for this release.

The track entitled "Shirley Temple Moment" is a spoken-word track presenting the making of UK #3 hit "Victims", along with a bitter argument between band members while rehearsing it. The fourth CD is totally dedicated to remix versions of both previously released and unreleased tracks, collectively called 'The Drumheads Sessions'.

Track listing

Disc 1
 "Put It Down" (demo)
 "You Know I'm Not Crazy" (demo)
 "Kissing to Be Clever" (demo)
 "Mr. Man" (B-side)
 "Stand Down" (demo)
 "Next to You" (demo)
 "Peculiar World" (demo)
 "Believe" (demo)
 "I'm Afraid of Me" (demo)
 "White Boy" (demo)
 "Moving Swiftly On"
 "Do You Really Want to Hurt Me" (demo)
 "Do You Really Want to Hurt Me"
 "Love Twist" (feat. Captain Crucial)
 "Time (Clock of the Heart)"
 "Shirley Temple Moment"
 "Victims"
 "I'll Tumble 4 Ya"
 "It's a Miracle"
 "Church of the Poison Mind"
 "Karma Chameleon"
 "Colour by Numbers"
 "If the Lord Can Forgive"
 "Changing Everyday"
 "That's the Way (I'm Only Trying to Help You)"
 "Miss Me Blind"

Disc 2
 "Man-Shake"
 "Murder Rap" (feat. Captain Crucial)
 "I Specialise in Loneliness" (Jimmy T & The Old Bastard Mix)
 "Mistake Number 3"
 "Love is Lonely"
 "Bow Down Mister" (A Small Portion 2 B Polite Mix)
 "Sweet Toxic Love"
 "Moghul Tomb" (demo)
 "Vanity Case" (Arabesque Mix)
 "Who Killed Rock 'n' Roll"
 "Starman"
 "Suffragette City"
 "Funtime"
 "Mr. Strange"
 "Spooky Truth"
 "Satan's Butterfly Ball" (4 Leigh Bowery) – with intro
 "These Boots Are Made for Walking" (Nancy Headbanger Mix)
 "Genocide Peroxide" (4 Maz)
 "Less Than Perfect"
 "Confidence Trick"
 "Sign Language"
 "How D'Ya Keep Your Credibility?"
 "Is There Cream in This Soup" (demo)

Disc 3
 "Do You Really Want to Hurt Me" (Kinky Roland Disco Mix)
 "Love Hurts" (Evolution Mix)
 "Same Thing in Reverse" (Evolution Mix)
 "See Thru" (MP3s Mix – dedicated to the late Chris McCoy – Nuff Love)
 "Strange Voodoo" (Jimmy T Prickly Heat Mix – feat. MC Filfy)
 "Do You Really Want to Hurt Me" (TMS-PMS Mix)
 "Masheri" (demo)
 "Grand Scheme of Things" (demo)
 "Lion's Roar" (demo)
 "Run, Run, Run" (demo)
 "Victims 2002"
 "Do You Really Want to Hurt Me" (Quiver Mix)
 "If I Were U" (Kinky Roland's 'Mind Over Substance' Mix)
 "Church of the Poison Mind" (Budgie Man Electro Mix)
 "Bow Down Mister" (6am Mix)

Disc 4
 "Karma Chameleon" (Nail Out of a Coffin 'Rewind Mix' – with Mr. Spee – 2002)
 "I Just Wanna Be Loved"
 "Black Money" (Hint of Helen Mix)
 "Everything I Own" (with Mr. Spee)
 "Love is Love 2002"
 "Kipsy" (with MC Kinky)
 "Time (Clock of the Heart)"
 "Hiroshima"
 "Armageddon"
 "Police & Thieves" (Dubversive Mix)
 "Cold Shoulder" (Scary Newman Mix)
 "Do You Really Want to Hurt Me" (Drumheads Twisted Nerve Mix)
 "Maybe I'm a Fool"
 "Crystal Blue Persuasion"

References

Culture Club albums
2002 compilation albums
Virgin Records compilation albums